Rubidograptis regulus is a species of moth of the family Tortricidae. It is found in Nigeria.

The length of the forewings is about 6 mm. The ground colour of the forewings is grey with a bluish hue and the costa is orange-yellow, spotted with brown. The distal area is yellowish cream marked with brown. There is a paler tornal blotch with a large group of brown scales. There is also a red pattern. The hindwings are brown-grey.

References

Endemic fauna of Nigeria
Moths described in 1981
Tortricini
Moths of Africa
Taxa named by Józef Razowski